Lazar Anđelković (born 10 February 1997) is a Serbian footballer, who plays as a defender for Moravac Orion.

Club career
Born in Niš, Anđelković came through the Radnički Niš youth academy. He signed a scholarship contract with the club at the beginning of 2014. He joined the first team for the 2015–16 Serbian SuperLiga season, but also stayed with youth team until the end of season. After he overgrown youth career, Anđelković moved on loan to Dunav Prahovo, where he played as a bonus player at dual registration until the end of the 2016–17 season in the Serbian League East. Next joined Radnički Pirot as a loaned player for the 2017–18 Serbian First League season.

Career statistics

Club

References

External links
 
 

1997 births
Living people
Sportspeople from Niš
Association football fullbacks
Serbian footballers
FK Radnički Niš players
FK Radnički Pirot players
Serbian First League players